Velpoor or Vailpoor is a village in Nizamabad district in the state of Telangana in India.

References 

Villages in Nizamabad district